Dundas is the name of an abandoned town in the Goldfields-Esperance Region of Western Australia.

Dundas was the location of an early gold find in the region in 1894. The town was gazetted on 22 May 1895 and derives its name from the Dundas Hills which, in turn, were named after Captain James Whitley Deans Dundas of the Royal Navy ship  in 1848.

The population of the town was 99 (71 males and 28 females) in 1898.

Further gold finds north of Dundas led to the establishment of Norseman, which, being the richer find, rapidly outgrew the former.

See also
 Shire of Dundas
 Dundas Land District

References

Ghost towns in Western Australia
Mining towns in Western Australia
Shire of Dundas